William Kennedy Jackson (24 December 1900 – 9 February 1986) was a Scottish professional football defender who played for clubs including Vale of Leven, Wrexham and Aberdeen.

Jackson began his career at Vale of Leven, with his form there earning him a move to England with Everton in March 1922; however he made little impact and moved on to Wrexham six months later, where he won the Welsh Cup in 1924.

Jackson then returned to Vale of Leven, was made captain, soon again attracted attention from bigger teams, and this time signed for Aberdeen in March 1925. For a brief period he was one of four men of the same surname in the line-up at Pittodrie, along with defender James and the brothers Wattie and Alex (who were from the same district as Willie but not related to him). He remained with the Dons until 1932, making 206 appearances in the Scottish Football League and Scottish Cup, albeit with no major trophies won: he played in a Scottish Cup semi-final defeat to Celtic in 1926, and the club finished third in the 1929–30 season, by which time Jackson, who originally played as a centre forward or inside left, had converted to a defender.

He reverted to Vale of Leven (by now reduced in status to an amateur team) for a third spell before being invited back to the SFL with Forfar Athletic.

Honours
Wrexham
Welsh Cup: 1924

References

1900 births
1986 deaths
Footballers from West Dunbartonshire
Association football inside forwards
Association football defenders
Scottish footballers
Wrexham A.F.C. players
Aberdeen F.C. players
Duntocher Hibernian F.C. players
Everton F.C. players
Vale of Leven F.C. players
Forfar Athletic F.C. players
St Johnstone F.C. players
Scottish Junior Football Association players
Scottish Football League players
English Football League players
People from Renton, West Dunbartonshire